Fields is an unincorporated community in Harney County, Oregon, United States, located  south of Burns.  It is the center of commerce for local ranches and the largest community between Denio, Nevada,  to the south, and Frenchglen, Oregon,  to the north.

The community has a single family-owned retail outlet and restaurant called Fields Station. The  radius around that store has below 25 occupants.

History

In 1881, Charles Fields established a homestead where the community of Fields is located today.  Fields built a stagecoach roadhouse to serve the stage route between Winnemucca, Nevada, and Burns.  A one-room school was established at the site around 1900 with one teacher.  Fields sold his business to John Smyth in 1911.  The Fields post office was opened two years later. The stone roadhouse was eventually remodeled into a store and restaurant, and is still in use. The original stone horse barn has partly collapsed, but remains in use.  Today, the community of Fields consists of a bar, store, cafe, gas station, school, campground, and a few houses.  As of 2003, the school has two rooms and two teachers serving kindergarten through eighth grade.

Ranching began in the area in 1869 when Whitehorse Ranch was established. Chinese workers collected alkali formed from evaporating spring water containing 80 parts per million (ppm) borate.

Climate
Averaging under  of precipitation per year, Fields is among the driest places in Oregon. The nearby Alvord Desert may be the driest. Fields, like the Alvord, experiences a continental or "cold" desert climate (Köppen climate classification BWk).

Demographics 

As of the 2010 census, the area of zip code 97710 had a population of 120, with 69 males and 51 females. Out of the 120 people, 119 identified as white. 19 members of the population (15.8%) were between 50 and 54 years old, the largest percentile. The average age was 44.5, and the average household size was 2.35 people.

Recreation 

Sightseers, hunters, and fishers often stop at Fields. Local wildlife include pronghorn, mule deer, elk, bighorn sheep, pheasants, doves, geese, and ducks. Rainbow trout are found in nearby streams. There are also publicly accessible hot springs in the area, including Alvord Hot Springs, Bog Hot Springs, and White Horse Hot Springs.

Education 
For K-8 residents are zoned to Fields Elementary School, of South Harney School District #33. One ranch zoned to Fields Elementary had, in 1998, a just under two hour commute to school per way.

In 1972 the school board of Fields Elementary permitted students to do paid janitorial duties after a teacher, offered money by the board to do janitorial duties, instead suggested that the students do so instead. That year, 16 students were enrolled. Later the grade school in Juntura adopted the janitorial idea from Fields after the Fields teacher moved to Juntura in 1975. Due to the small size of Fields Elementary, the South Harney #33 board decided not to have a dedicated janitorial employee. The students use the money to pay for field trips.

High school students are zoned to Crane Union High School, of Harney County Union High School District 1J.

Harney County is not in a community college district but has a "contract out of district" (COD) with Treasure Valley Community College. TVCC operates the Burns Outreach Center in Burns.

References

Unincorporated communities in Harney County, Oregon
1913 establishments in Oregon
Unincorporated communities in Oregon